Aeroflot Flight N-528 was a regular commercial flight from Odessa to Berdyansk that crashed while attempting to land in poor weather conditions.

Aircraft 
The aircraft involved in the accident was a Yakovlev Yak-40 registered to Aeroflot.  The aircraft rolled off the assembly line at Saratov factory on 17 November 1972.

Timeline and Summary 
At 11:16:37 weather observers recommended a storm warning to the manager, to which he said: "busy." In violation of the law, the information was not passed along the chain of command. At 11:16:47 the crew asked the controller about the radar visibility. After receiving this information, the crew decided to go through the system. After receiving this information, the crew decided not to do a go-around. At 11:20:24 they were given permission to land at Berdyansk. At 11:20:25 weather observers at the request of the dispatcher gave weather information about the storm, downpour, windspeed, and visibility. At 11:21 the pilot, questioning the visibility of 500 meters, attempted to assess visibility using his instruments, but in violation of flight procedures did not disclose this to the controller. The plane landed about  down the  runway while being too fast on the touchdown, and then hydroplaned. The plane hit several trees, broke apart, then caught fire. Five passengers died at the scene, with one more passenger and two flight attendants dying later from their injuries.

Causes 
Cited among the multiple causes of the crash was the decision to land at Berdyansk Airport despite the weather conditions and poor visibility.  The committee also cited poor human resource management at the control tower and weather station.  The lack of accurate weather data given to the crew was cited as a contributing factor.

See also 

Aeroflot accidents and incidents
Aeroflot accidents and incidents in the 1980s
China Airlines Flight 140, an Airbus A300 that crashed during an attempted go around due to pilot errors.

References 

N-528
Aviation accidents and incidents in Ukraine
Aviation accidents and incidents in 1987
Aviation accidents and incidents in the Soviet Union
1987 in the Soviet Union
June 1987 events in Europe
Accidents and incidents involving the Yakovlev Yak-40
1987 in Ukraine
Berdiansk
1987 disasters in Ukraine